Kevin McKernan (born 3 December 1987) is a Gaelic footballer from County Down, Northern Ireland. He plays for the Down senior inter-county football team.

Playing career

Inter-county
McKernan has been a member of the Down team since 2008 but made his debut in 2007. He also plays Midfield or Half Forward. He started at centre back in 2010, in which Down lost 0-15 to 0-16 to Cork. Kevin won a Dr McKenna Cup in 2008 scoring 1 point from play he won an Ulster Under-21 Football Championship in 2008 beating Derry 3-11 to 1-14.

Family
His father, Brendan, was Right Corner Back on the Down Team that won the All Ireland in 1991.

International rules
McKernan was part of the Ireland team that won the 2011 International Rules Series against Australia by 130 to 65.

He trained with Ireland ahead of the 2013 International Rules Series but was overlooked for the panel due to a bruised knee.

Honours
Down
Dr McKenna Cup (1): 2008
Ulster Under-21 Football Championship (1): 2008
All-Ireland Minor Football Championship (1): 2005
All-Ireland Football Championship (1): 2010 (runner-up)
Ulster Senior Football Championship (1): 2012 (runner-up)
Ireland
International Rules (1): 2011
Burren
Down Senior Football Championship (3): 2010, 2011, 2018 
Down Senior Football League Division 1 (2) 2006-12 (c)
Down Under-21 Football Championship (2): 2006-08 (c)
School
MacRory Cup (1): 2006 (c)
Hogan Cup (1): 2006 (c)
Awards
Ulster Colleges All-Star (2): 2005-06
Irish News All-Star (1): 2010 
Down County Final Man of the Match (1): 2011
GPA Gaelic Team of the Year (1): 2010
Ulster Club All-Star (1): 2011-12

References

 

1987 births
Living people
Burren Gaelic footballers
Down inter-county Gaelic footballers
Irish international rules football players
People educated at Abbey Christian Brothers' Grammar School
Sportspeople from Newry